Snapped is an American true crime television series  produced by Jupiter Entertainment. The series depicts high profile or bizarre cases of women accused of murder. Each episode outlines the motivation for murder, whether it be revenge against a cheating husband or lover, a large insurance payoff, or the ending to years of abuse, with each murder's circumstances as unique as the women profiled.

Snapped premiered on August 6, 2004 on Oxygen. It has since become the network's longest-running original series, with its 28 defined seasons and sixteen years in production (and two spin-offs) outlasting the seventeen seasons and thirteen years of the Bad Girls Club. The show also played a large role in the decision by parent company NBCUniversal to relaunch Oxygen as a crime network in 2017. , 500 original episodes of Snapped have aired.

Synopsis
The series features non-fiction narratives of people who have committed murder or attempted murder or have been accused of committing or attempting to commit murder. Often the target is the individual's spouse. The program is edited in a documentary style, using a central voice-over narration by actress Jody Flader, as well as interviews with people in possession of first-hand knowledge of the case, including law-enforcement officials, lawyers, journalists, friends and family members of both the victims and the accused, and at times the criminals or victims themselves. A few rare episodes during the series run have centered on male perpetrators, while a larger number of episodes have featured men who conspired with the central female perpetrator in the crime.

Production
Snapped first aired on August 6, 2004, with the pilot episode, "Celeste Beard Johnson" The series is currently in its thirty-first season of production at Jupiter Entertainment.

Actresses Laura San Giacomo and Ronnie Farer narrated the first and second seasons, respectively. Sharon Martin took the role of narrator in its third season, with a distinctive and pronounced oral cadence. She acquired an additional credit as a supervising producer of the series. In February 2018, Martin announced she would no longer narrate the series. The new narrator is actress Jody Flader, according to the end-of-episode credits and Flader's web site.

In October 2020, Oxygen announced—in celebration of the series' 500th episode—it would air a two-week experience, billed as "Snapped: The Killer Women Event." The event will include original pilot episode and a never-before-seen episode. The event culminated in the airing of the 500th episode, focusing on the murder of Randy Sheridan, on November 22, 2020.

Episodes
A complete list of Snapped episodes:

Season 1 (2004)

Season 2 (2005)

Season 3 (2005)

Season 4 (2006)

Season 5 (2007)

Season 6 (2007–2008)

Season 7 (2009–2010)

Season 8 (2011–2012)

Season 9 (2012–2013)

Season 10 (2013)

Season 11 (2013–2014)

Season 12 (2014)

Season 13 (2014)

Season 14 (2014–2015)

Season 15 (2015)

Season 16 (2015–2016)

Season 17 (2016)

Season 18 (2016)

Season 19 (2016–2017)

Season 20 (2017)

Season 21 (2017)

Season 22 (2017–2018)

Season 23 (2018)

Season 24 (2018–2019)

Season 25 (2019)

Season 26 (2019–2020)

Season 27 (2020)

Season 28 (2020–2021)

Season 29 (2021)

Season 30 (2021-2022)

Season 31 (2022)

Snapped Notorious 
To celebrate its twentieth season, Oxygen announced it would open its "killer season" with a two-hour "Notorious" specials focusing on infamous criminals.

Season 1

Season 2

Season 3

See also
 Deadly Women
 Facing Evil with Candice DeLong
 Snapped: Killer Couples
 Snapped: She Made Me Do It
 Wives with Knives
 ''On the Case with Paula Zahn

References

Further reading
 Die, My Love: A True Story of Revenge, Murder, and Two Texas Sisters, by true crime author Kathryn Casey about Piper Rountree and her husband's murder (2007).
 She Wanted It All: A True Story of Sex, Murder, and a Texas Millionaire, by Kathryn Casey about the Celeste Beard and Tracey Tarleton case (2005).
 Murder Behind the Badge: True Stories of Cops Who Kill, a book by former police officer Stacy Dittrich, which includes the Antoinette Frank case (2009).
 Bitter Almonds:The True Story of Mothers, Daughters, and the Seattle Cyanide Murders, by Gregg Olsen, the story of Stella Nickell (2003).
 Death in the Desert: The Ted Binion Homicide Case, by true crime author Cathy Scott, about defendants Sandy Murphy and Rick Tabish (2000).

External links 
 
 Official UK website at Crime & Investigation Network (UK)
 
 

2004 American television series debuts
2000s American documentary television series
2010s American documentary television series
2020s American documentary television series
2000s American crime television series
2010s American crime television series
2020s American crime television series
English-language television shows
Oxygen (TV channel) original programming
True crime television series